The women's 500 m time trial at the 2018 Commonwealth Games, was part of the cycling programme, which took place on 7 April 2018.

Records
Prior to this competition, the existing world and Games records were as follows:

Results

References

Women's 500 m time trial
Cycling at the Commonwealth Games – Women's 500 m time trial
Comm